Jay and Joy is the first purely vegan cheese producer of France. Most of the company's products contain Spanish almonds, while others use cashew nuts or sunflower seeds, as well as spices. Its most successful product is a camembert-like almond and cashew cheese called Joséphine.

The company makes its products in La Croix-Saint-Ouen north of Paris and sells them retail and online in several European countries. Jay and Joy also operates a cheese shop in the 11th arrondissement of Paris, called  ("The plant-based creamery"). As of 2020, more of its customers are lactose intolerant than vegan.

History 
The company was started in Paris in 2014 by Mary Iriarte Jähnke, a vegan and former fashion employee with a French-Venezuelan background, and her German partner Eric Jähnke, also a vegan and an engineer by education. Mary Jähnke took lessons from a master cheesemaker, saying the company defends the craft of cheesemaking.

Jay and Joy's first retail partner was the French organic chain . In 2018, they started exports, beginning with the Belgian organic chain Bio-Planet (operated by the Colruyt Group). They then expanded sales to the Netherlands and Germany. , 20% of the company's revenue stems from exports.

They first produced in the 11th arrondissement of Paris but moved out to La Croix north of the capital in 2019, expanding the production floor from 60 to 450 square metres.

See also 

 La Fauxmagerie, the first vegan cheese producer of the United Kingdom
 Dr Mannah's, a German vegan cheese producer founded in 2012

References 

Vegan organizations
Veganism in France
Vegan brands
Cheese analogues
Cheesemakers